The Historic Places Act 1993 was an Act of the New Zealand Parliament. It defines Heritage New Zealand and its roles of preserving, marking and recording places of historic interest in New Zealand.

Statutes of New Zealand
Historic preservation legislation
Heritage New Zealand
1993 in New Zealand law